Kučín is a village and municipality in Vranov nad Topľou District in the Prešov Region of eastern Slovakia.

External links
 
 
https://web.archive.org/web/20070513023228/http://www.statistics.sk/mosmis/eng/run.html

Villages and municipalities in Vranov nad Topľou District